Yannis Papathanasiou ( was born in Athens1954) is a Greek politician, former Minister for Economy and Finance of Greece. He is a member of the Hellenic Parliament with the conservative New Democracy party since 2002.

Background, business and political career
Papathanasiou was born in Athens on 1954.
He studied Electrical Engineering at the National Technical University of Athens.

He has been chairman and managing director of the company ‘I. D. Papathanassiou SA - Trading of technological equipment for buildings since December 31, 2002.

He has been Member of the Board of Directors (1982–1988), Secretary General (1988–1993) and President (1994–2000) of the Athens Chamber of Commerce and Industry (ACCI).

In the period 1991-1992, he was advisor on energy issues, at the Minister of Commerce Industry and Energy and between 1992–1993, he has been vice-chairman of the Board of Directors of Public Gas Corporation (DEPA).

He was first elected member of the Hellenic Parliament in 2002, from the state deputies' list, with New Democracy party and then was elected member of the parliament in Athens B constituency, in the elections of 2004, 2007 and 2009.

References

External links
Official website of the Greek Ministry of Economy and Finance
Personal Website of Yannis Papathanasiou

|-

1954 births
Finance ministers of Greece
Greek MPs 2000–2004
Greek MPs 2004–2007
Greek MPs 2007–2009
Greek MPs 2009–2012
Greek MPs 2012 (May)
Living people
National Technical University of Athens alumni
New Democracy (Greece) politicians
Politicians from Athens